The nigritas, formerly called negrofinches, are small passerine birds belonging to the genus Nigrita in the estrildid finch family Estrildidae. There are four species which occur in forest, secondary growth and scrubland in West, Central and East Africa.

They are 10-15 centimetres long. The bill is short and black and is fairly slender in some species. The colour of the plumage varies but all have a dark tail. The upperparts are grey or brown and the underparts are black, grey, white or reddish brown. The grey-headed nigrita and male pale-fronted nigrita have a black face and the white-breasted nigrita has a black cap. Nigritas have whistling or trilling songs and calls.

They feed on insects, fruit and seeds. They often forage high in the treetops, usually alone or in pairs.

Species list

References
Clement, Peter; Harris, Alan & Davies, John (1993) Finches and Sparrows: An Identification Guide, Christopher Helm, London.
Sinclair, Ian & Ryan, Peter (2003) Birds of Africa south of the Sahara, Struik, Cape Town.

 
Bird genera
 
Taxa named by Hugh Edwin Strickland